Prunus beccarii is a species of Prunus native to Borneo with a few sterile specimens discovered on Sumatra. It is a tree reaching 27m and can be distinguished from similar species by the absence of any basal leaf glands but the presence of a large hollow gland in its stipules. Among the Penan people it is called betolei, a name they also give to the much more common Prunus arborea.

References

beccarii
Flora of Borneo
Flora of Sumatra
Plants described in 1965